William J. Reese is the Carl F. Kaestle Wisconsin Alumni Research Foundation (WARF) Professor of Educational Policy Studies and History at the University of Wisconsin–Madison. He received a Vilas Distinguished Achievement professorship in May 2015.

References

Further reading 

 

Wilkes University alumni
Bowling Green State University alumni
University of Wisconsin–Madison alumni
University of Wisconsin–Madison faculty
American historians of education
Scholars of American education
Living people
Year of birth missing (living people)